When It's All Said and Done is the second EP by American singer-songwriter Giveon. It was released on October 2, 2020, by Epic Records.

Critical reception
In a review for AllMusic, Andy Kellman explained that the album is centered on Giveon's "deep baritone and elegant, often aching, ruminations. Not many active R&B artists are as effective at conveying conflicting emotions with such nuance."

Chart performance
In the US, When It's All Said and Done peaked at number 93 on the Billboard 200 on the chart dated October 17, 2020.

The single "Stuck on You" peaked at number 17 on Billboards Hot R&B Songs on February 27, 2021, after nine weeks on the chart.

Track listing
Credits adapted from Tidal

Charts

References

External links
 
 

2021 EPs
Giveon albums
Epic Records EPs